Magic is the fifteenth studio album by Bruce Springsteen, released by Columbia Records on LP on September 25, 2007, and on CD on October 2. It was his first with the E Street Band since The Rising in 2002, and topped the charts in six countries, including the US and UK, going triple platinum in Ireland. The album ranked No. 2 on Rolling Stone'''s list of the Top 50 Albums of 2007.

BackgroundMagic was announced on August 16, 2007, following months of speculation, and was characterized by Springsteen's manager Jon Landau as a "high energy rock" album with a "heavy E Street Band" sound."Bruce Springsteen's 'Magic' Set for October 2 Release on Columbia Records", Shore Fire Media press release, August 16, 2007. Accessed August 16, 2007. It consisted of new tracks, apart from "Long Walk Home", which had been performed once on the latter part of the 2006 Sessions Band Tour. Most songs had been written by the end of 2006, and Springsteen allowed Brendan O'Brien, who had also produced The Rising (2002) and Devils & Dust (2005), to pick the ones that worked the best.Andy Greene, "More On New Bruce Springsteen Album: Producer Brendan O’Brien Reveals All", Rolling Stone, August 17, 2007. Accessed August 18, 2007. Recording commenced in March at Southern Tracks Recording Studio in Atlanta and took two months. It was complicated by the band members' schedules, especially drummer Max Weinberg's weekday commitments to taping Late Night with Conan O'Brien. The musicians did not record as a unit. During the week Springsteen worked on vocal tracks and production, and was joined on weekends by the core band of Weinberg, bassist Garry Tallent, and pianist Roy Bittan to record the basic tracks. The other band members overdubbed their parts under O'Brien's watch, apart from saxophonist and longtime foil Clarence Clemons, who worked directly with Springsteen due to "a whole dynamic that spans decades."

The lead-off single, "Radio Nowhere", had been slated for a September 4 release, but was leaked on August 22.Andy Greene, "Bruce Springsteen’s ‘Magic’: Exclusive Details on New E Street Band Album", Rolling Stone, August 16, 2007. Accessed August 16, 2007. The release of the CD on October 2 was preceded by a September 25 release on vinyl record, in order to qualify for the Grammy Awards.Phil Gallo, "Springsteen's 'Magic' Sitting Outside Grammy's Window: Might A Back Door Plot Be Devised?" , Variety The Set List column, August 16, 2007. Accessed August 21, 2007. The album became available for pre-order on iTunes on August 28, with a promotion featuring "Radio Nowhere" as a free downloadable single, and the first legs of the accompanying Magic Tour were also announced.

Themes
Several songs in Magic express disillusionment with the state of American society. Others, such as the title track ("I got a shiny saw blade/All I need's a volunteer/I'll cut you in half/While you're smilin' ear to ear") convey a more general sense of foreboding. "Girls in Their Summer Clothes" has been cited as a singularly "breezy" song on the album, although A. O. Scott of The New York Times notes that not even this track is "untouched by melancholy. Its narrator, after all, stands and watches as the girls of the title 'pass me by. Several sources have suggested that "Last to Die", with its chorus of "Who'll be the last to die for a mistake/Whose blood will spill, whose heart will break", was inspired by Vietnam Veterans Against the War representative John Kerry's 1971 testimony to the U.S. Senate, in which he asked "How do you ask a man to be the last man to die in Vietnam? How do you ask a man to be the last man to die for a mistake?".Quillen, Shay. Springsteen's 'Magic' ends with a political wallop, The San Jose Mercury News, October 6, 2007. Accessed November 5, 2007. "Gypsy Biker" concerns the homecoming of a US soldier killed in action in Iraq, and Springsteen has said that "Livin' in the Future" references extraordinary rendition and illegal wiretapping. "Long Walk Home" is a metaphorical account of the narrator's sense that, in the artist's words, those people living at home "he thought he knew, whose ideals he had something in common with, are like strangers."

Release and salesMagic sold well, becoming Springsteen's seventh No. 1 in the UK, with first week sales of 77,692, making it his fastest-starting release of the 21st century. The album debuted at No. 1 on the US Billboard 200 chart, becoming Springsteen's eighth chart topper, and selling about 335,000 copies in its first week. After falling to No. 2 for one week, it retook the top slot, selling about 77,000 copies that week. Magic achieved its US sales despite receiving relatively little radio airplay. Fox News reported that media conglomerate Clear Channel had instructed its classic rock stations not to play any tracks from the album, while continuing to play Springsteen songs from the 1970s and '80s. Clear Channel responded by claiming that "in the first days after the CD's release" its stations had played the record more than others had. By January 2009, Magic had sold one million copies in the US.

Critical reception

Critics generally responded positively to the album. Pitchfork noted that it was "a surprisingly complex album that hides its disillusionment deep within its music, mingling it with a weary optimism that has not diminished with age." In The Village Voices annual Pazz & Jop critics poll for the year's best albums, Magic ranked No. 9. It ranked No. 2 on Rolling Stones list of the Top 50 Albums of 2007, and "Long Walk Home" was No. 8 on its list of the 100 Best Songs of 2007 The album was nominated for the Grammy Award for Best Rock Album but lost to the Foo Fighters' Echoes, Silence, Patience & Grace.

Track listing

Two weeks after the album's initial announcement, which included an eleven-song track listing, "Terry's Song" was added. It is a memorial song for Springsteen's long-time assistant Terry Magovern, who died on July 30, 2007."Terry Magovern, Rest in Peace", Backstreets.com, August 1, 2007. Accessed September 15, 2009. Some pressings of the CD pre-ordered through Sony Music or other channels did not contain the extra track.

PersonnelThe E Street BandBruce Springsteen – lead and backing vocals, guitars, pump organ, harmonica, synthesizer, glockenspiel, percussion
Roy Bittan – piano, organ
Clarence Clemons – saxophone, backing vocals
Danny Federici – organ, keyboards
Nils Lofgren – guitars, backing vocals
Patti Scialfa – backing vocals
Garry Tallent – bass guitar
Steven Van Zandt – guitars, mandolin, backing vocals
Max Weinberg – drumsAdditional musiciansSoozie Tyrell – violin (tracks 3, 7–9), backing vocals (track 8)
Jeremy Chatzky – upright bass (track 8)
Daniel Laufer – cello (track 11)
Patrick Warren – Chamberlin, tack piano (tracks 4, 6, 8, 10, 11)
String section (tracks 4, 6):
Kenn Wagner, Jay Christy, Justin Bruns, William Pu, Cristopher Pulgram, John Meisner, Olga Shpitko, Sheela Lyengar – violins
Tania Maxwell Clements, Amy Chang, Lachlan McBane – viola
Karen Freer, Daniel Laufer, Charae Kruege – celloTechnical'''

 Brendan O'Brien – production, mixing
 Nick DiDia – recording 
 Billy Bowers – additional engineering
 Tom Tapley – recording and mixing assistant
 Toby Scott – additional recording engineer
 Tom Syrowski, Matt Serrecchio, Glenn Pittman, Kevin Mills – additional recording assistants
 Bob Ludwig – mastering
 Eddie Horst – string arrangements (tracks 4, 6)
 Patti Horst, Shari Sutcliffe – string contractors (tracks 4, 6)
 Michelle Holme, Chris Austopchuk – album art direction 
 Mark Seliger, Danny Clinch – photography
 Bea Nettles – disk icon

Charts

Weekly charts

Year-end charts

Certifications and sales

References

External links
 

Bruce Springsteen albums
2007 albums
Music of Atlanta
Albums produced by Brendan O'Brien (record producer)
Columbia Records albums